The following is a list of episodes of the Australian television series Wilfred. The series premiered on SBS TV on 19 March 2007. It ran for two seasons of eight episodes each; the finale aired on 26 April 2010.

Series overview

Episodes

Season 1 (2007)

Season 2 (2010)

References 

Wilfred
Episodes